Gianluigi Bamonte (born 5 May 1984) is an Italian footballer who plays for Alfonsine FC 1921.

Biography
Born in Salerno, Campania region, Bamonte had spent most of his career at Emilia–Romagna region. He had played for Serie C2 club Fiorenzuola, Serie D clubs Faenza (2002–03, 2003–04 Serie D and 2004–05 Eccellenza), Boca – San Lazzaro, Chiari (which located in Lombardy region), Riccione, Cervia and Tritium (another Lombard team). From 2008 to 2010 Bamonte spent 2 seasons with Cesenatico, which the team won the promotion play-offs of Eccellenza and promoted to Serie D, the Italian fifth level. At the same time he was signed by Bellaria – Igea Marina, and made his professional debut, in the lowest division of professional league – Lega Pro Seconda Divisione (Italian fourth level).

On 5 July 2012 he was signed by Serie B club Cesena in 1-year contract, yet another Emilia–Romagna club. He wore no.17 shirt, traditionally a number of bad luck which rarely picked by people in first priority. However all other number from 1 to 30 were already occupied. Bamonte only played twice for Cesena in 2012–13 Serie B. On 31 January 2013 he left for Santarcangelo, where Cesena had loaned several youth products to the Romagna club, such as Manuel Canini, Thomas Fabbri and Nicola Del Pivo (since 10 January). On the same day, the last day of winter transfer window, Cesena also recalled Alessandro Saporetti from Santarcangelo.

References

External links
 Lega Serie B profile 
 

Italian footballers
Tritium Calcio 1908 players
A.C. Bellaria Igea Marina players
A.C. Cesena players
Santarcangelo Calcio players
Serie B players
Association football defenders
People from Salerno
1984 births
Living people
Footballers from Campania
Sportspeople from the Province of Salerno